Herman Onno Christiaan Rudolf "Onno" Ruding (born 15 August 1939) is a retired Dutch politician of the Christian Democratic Appeal (CDA) party and businessman.

Ruding worked as student researcher at the Erasmus University Rotterdam from June 1964 until July 1969 and worked as a civil servant for the Ministry of Finance from February 1965 until June 1971 and as Deputy Director-General of the department for International Monetary Affairs from February 1965 until September 1966 and Director-General of the Department for International Monetary Affairs from September 1966 until June 1971. Ruding worked as an investment banker for the AMRO Bank from June 1971 until January 1977. In December 1976 Ruding was nominated as an Executive Director of the International Monetary Fund (IMF), taking office on 1 January 1977. In December 1980 Ruding was nominated as CFO and Vice Chairman of the Board of directors of the AMRO Bank, he resigned as Executive Director of the International Monetary Fund on 31 December 1980 and was installed as CFO and Vice Chairman of the AMRO Bank on 1 January 1981.

After the election of 1982 Ruding was appointed as Minister of Finance in the Cabinet Lubbers I, taking office on 4 November 1982. Ruding was elected as a Member of the House of Representatives after the election of 1986, taking office on 3 June 1986. Following the cabinet formation of 1986 Ruding continued as Minister of Finance in the Cabinet Lubbers II, taking office on 14 July 1986. On 3 May 1989 the Cabinet Lubbers II fell and continued to serve in a demissionary capacity. In July 1989 Ruding announced that he would not stand for the election of 1989. The Cabinet Lubbers II was replaced by the Cabinet Lubbers III on 7 November 1989. Ruding retired from active politics and returned to the private sector and public sector, in December 1989 Ruding was nominated as a Chairman of the Christian Employers' association (NCW), taking office on 1 January 1990. In February 1992 Ruding was nominated as Vice Chairman of the Board of directors of Citigroup, he resigned as Chairman of the Christian Employers' association on 21 March 1992 the same day he was installed as Vice Chairman of the Board of directors of Citigroup. In December 1999 Ruding was appointed as COO of Citibank Europe, serving from 1 January 2000 until 1 October 2003.

Following his retirement Ruding remains active in the private sector and public sector and continues to occupy numerous seats as a corporate director and nonprofit director on several supervisory boards (Centre for European Policy Studies, Society for Statistics and Operations Research, NIBC Bank, International Statistical Institute and the Tinbergen Institute).

Decorations

References

External links

Official
  Dr. H.O.Ch.R. (Onno) Ruding Parlement & Politiek

 

 
 

 

1939 births
Living people
Businesspeople from Washington, D.C.
Christian Democratic Appeal politicians
Commanders of the Order of Orange-Nassau
Commandeurs of the Légion d'honneur
Citigroup employees
Dutch bankers
Dutch business writers
Dutch chief executives in the finance industry
Dutch corporate directors
Dutch expatriates in Belgium
Dutch expatriates in England
Dutch expatriates in the United States
Dutch financial advisors
Dutch financial analysts
Dutch financial writers
Dutch lobbyists
Dutch nonprofit directors
Dutch nonprofit executives
Dutch officials of the United Nations
Dutch Roman Catholics
Dutch trade association executives
Erasmus University Rotterdam alumni
Academic staff of Erasmus University Rotterdam
Grand Officers of the Order of the Crown (Belgium)
International Monetary Fund people
International economists
Knights Commander of the Order of Merit of the Federal Republic of Germany
Knights Grand Cross of the Order of Merit of the Italian Republic
Knights of the Holy Sepulchre
Knights of the Order of the Netherlands Lion
Members of the House of Representatives (Netherlands)
Members of the Social and Economic Council
Ministers of Finance of the Netherlands
Monetarists
Monetary economists
People from Breda
People from Wassenaar
Royal Netherlands Army personnel
20th-century Dutch businesspeople
20th-century Dutch civil servants
20th-century Dutch economists
20th-century Dutch male writers
20th-century Dutch military personnel
20th-century Dutch politicians
21st-century Dutch businesspeople
21st-century Dutch economists
21st-century Dutch male writers